Joël Félix (born 1960) is a professor of European history at the University of Reading. Félix is a specialist in the Ancien Régime and the French Revolution.

Selected publications
Louis XVI et Marie-Antoinette. Un couple en politique, Payot, Paris, 2006. (awarded the prix Paul-Michel Perret by the Académie des Sciences Morales et Politiques, 2006).
Finances et politique au siècle des Lumières: le ministère L'Averdy, 1763-1768, Comité pour l'Histoire Economique et Financière de la France, Paris, 1999.
Economie et finances sous l'Ancien Régime, guide du chercheur, 1523-1789, Comité pour l'Histoire Economique et Financière de la France, Paris, 1994.
Les Magistrats du Parlement de Paris, 1771-1789, Sedopols, Paris, 1990.

References

Academics of the University of Reading
20th-century French historians
21st-century French historians
French historiographers
Living people
1960 births
Historians of the French Revolution